Edward Hulse may refer to:

Sir Edward Hulse, 1st Baronet (c. 1682–1759) of the Hulse baronets
Sir Edward Hulse, 2nd Baronet (1714–1800) of the Hulse baronets
Sir Edward Hulse, 3rd Baronet (1744–1816), High Sheriff of Hampshire
Sir Edward Hulse, 5th Baronet (1809–1899), of the Hulse baronets
Sir Edward Hulse, 6th Baronet (1859–1903), British politician
Sir Edward Hulse, 7th Baronet (1889–1915), British Army officer
Sir Edward Hulse, 10th Baronet (1932–2022), of the Hulse baronets
Edward Hulse (physician) (died 1711), see Harveian Oration